Safari Helicopter is an American kit aircraft manufacturer located in Hendersonville, Tennessee.

The company was originally known as Canadian Home Rotors and then Safari Helicopter and was founded in Ear Falls, Ontario, Canada. It was purchased by the Marianna, Florida-based company CHR International in August 2009.

Safari Helicopters moved their headquarters from Marianna, Florida to Hendersonville, Tennessee in 2021.

Aircraft 
 Canadian Home Rotors Safari

References

External links
 

Helicopter manufacturers of Canada